Amra Pandžić  (born 20 September 1989) is a Slovenian handball player for  CS Minaur Baia Mare and the Slovenian national team.

She was selected to represent Slovenia at the 2017 World Women's Handball Championship.

References

External links

1989 births
Living people
Slovenian female handball players
Handball players from Ljubljana
Expatriate handball players in Turkey
Slovenian expatriate sportspeople in Turkey
Mediterranean Games competitors for Slovenia
Competitors at the 2009 Mediterranean Games